Paul Outerbridge, Jr. (August 15, 1896 – October 17, 1958) was an American photographer prominent for his early use and experiments in color photography.

Outerbridge was a fashion and commercial photographer, an early pioneer and teacher of color photography, and a creator of erotic nude photographs that could not be exhibited in his lifetime.

Photography career 
While still in his teens, Outerbridge worked as an illustrator and theatrical designer creating stage settings and lighting schemes. After an accident caused his discharge from the Royal Canadian Naval Air Service, in 1917, he enlisted in the U.S. Army where he produced his first photographic work.

In 1921, Outerbridge enrolled in the Clarence H. White school of photography at Columbia University. Within a year his work began being published in Vanity Fair and Vogue magazines.

In London, in 1925, the Royal Photographic Society invited Outerbridge to exhibit in a one-man show.

Paris 
Outerbridge then traveled to Paris and became friends with the artists and photographers Man Ray, Marcel Duchamp, and Berenice Abbott. In Paris he produced a layout for the French Vogue magazine, met and worked with Edward Steichen, and built the largest, most completely equipped advertising photography studio of the time.

In 1929, 12 of Outerbridge's photographs were included in the prestigious German Film und Foto exhibition.

New York

Returning to New York in 1929, Outerbridge opened a studio producing commercial and artistic work, and began writing a monthly column on color photography for the U.S. Camera Magazine. Outerbridge became known for the high quality of his color illustrations, made by an extremely complex tri-color carbro process.

In 1937, Outerbridge's photographs were included in an exhibit at the Museum of Modern Art and in 1940 he published his seminal book Photographing in Color, using high quality illustrations to explain his techniques.

Outerbridge's vivid color nude studies included early fetish photos and were too indecent under contemporary standards to find general public acceptance. A scandal over his erotic photography led to Outerbridge retiring as a commercial photographer and moving to Hollywood in 1943. Despite the controversy, Outerbridge continued to contribute photo stories to magazines and write his monthly column.

In 1945, he married fashion designer Lois Weir and worked in their joint fashion company, Lois-Paul Originals.

He died of lung cancer in 1958.

One year after his death, the Smithsonian Institution staged a one-man show of Outerbridge's photographs. Although his reputation has faded, revivals of Outerbridge's photography in the 1970s and 1990s periodically brought him into public awareness.

Books 
Outerbridge, Paul. Photographing in Color. New York: Random House, 1940.

Paul Outerbridge: 1896-1958, Paul Outerbridge, Carol McCusker, Elaine Dines-Cox, M. F. Agha, and Manfred Heiting, Editor (1999), 
Graham Howe, with co-curators Ewing, W. and Prodger, P. Paul Outerbridge: New Color Photographs from Mexico and California, 1948–1955. Nazraeli Press, 2009.

References

External links 
 International Center of Photography. . 1984.
 Amon Carter Museum. . December 17, 1996.
 J. Paul Getty Museum. Paul Outerbridge.

1896 births
1958 deaths
Deaths from lung cancer in California
20th-century American photographers
American portrait photographers